Percival Hopkins Spencer (April 30, 1897 – January 16, 1995) was an American inventor, aviation pioneer, test pilot, and businessman.

Biography
He was born on April 30, 1897 to Christopher Miner Spencer (1833-1922), the inventor of, among other things, the Spencer repeating rifle.

The then 14-year-old Spencer built his first pontooned hang glider in April 1911 from plans he found in a Popular Mechanics magazine. On May 15, 1914, Spencer made his first powered flight in a Curtiss flying boat. In 1929, he broke the light airplane altitude record——piloting a Curtiss Robin monoplane.      Spencer was the president of Amphibians Inc. for three years selling amphibian designs.

In 1937, he joined Sikorsky engineer Victor A. Larsen to  form the Spencer-Larsen Aircraft Corporation and design their first, and only, amphibious aircraft, the Spencer-Larsen SL-12C. Development of the plane progressed slowly and in September 1940, Spencer left the partnership to form his own company, the Spencer Aircraft Company.

His resulting design was the Spencer S-12 Air Car Amphibian. Construction began on March 1, 1941. The small, two-seat S-12 prototype, registration NX29098, made its first flight on August 8, 1941. The S-12 was a fabric-covered amphibian with a unique boxlike forward cabin; a high wing with a two-bladed propeller in pusher configuration; and a long, slender tail boom.

In December 1941, Spencer put the Air Car into storage and joined the war effort as a test pilot for the Republic Aircraft Corporation.  By 1943, he had flight tested 134 of the company's P-47 Thunderbolts.

In April 1943, Spencer left Republic Aircraft for the Mills Novelty Company of Chicago, Illinois, which wanted to use his Air Car to promote the company. Spencer used the company's wood forming equipment to build a new egg-shaped cabin for the Air Car and began demonstrating the aircraft to his former employers, Republic Aircraft.

Seeing the potential of the Air Car as the perfect sports plane for pilots returning from the war, Republic purchased the rights to the Air Car in December 1943 and immediately began development of an all-metal version designated the Model RC-1 Thunderbolt Amphibian. On November 30, 1944, the first RC-1 Thunderbolt Amphibian, registered NX41816, made its first flight with Spencer at the controls. The design led to the Republic RC-3 Seabee. On November 22, 1945, the prototype RC-3 (NX87451) came off the assembly line at Republic's factory in Farmingdale, New York, and on December 1 made its first flight in Farmingdale with Spencer at the controls.

In 1968, Spencer and retired United States Air Force Colonel Dale L. "Andy" Anderson formed a new company to market a four-place amphibious homebuilt design once again called the Spencer Amphibian Air Car, with S-12C, S-12D, and S-12E, and S-14 variants. The first example was test flown in 1970 in Chino, California. The unit had a build cost of $8700.00. The S-12-D Aircar was an improved and larger four-seat aircraft, which retains the basic layout of the Seabee. The two-seat S-14 used advanced composites and was test flown by Spencer in 1983 at the age of 86. Its design did not meet expectations and the sole example was donated to the Experimental Aircraft Association Museum in Oshkosh, Wisconsin.

Spencer died at a nursing home in Torrance, California in 1995, aged 97.

References

External links
Percival Spencer biography
Biography

1897 births
1995 deaths
Aircraft designers
American aviators
American test pilots
American aviation businesspeople
Aviators from Connecticut
Members of the Early Birds of Aviation
People from Windsor, Connecticut
American aviation record holders
20th-century American inventors